Sam Johnson (born 6 May 1993) is a Liberian footballer who last played for Kazakhstani club FC Aksu as a forward.

Career
Johnson started out playing for his village team before joining Liberian third division side New Dream FC. With them he scored two goals in a cup game against Liberian Premier League club Nimba FC who were so impressed by his performance that they ended up signing him.

In 2011 Johnson travelled to Norway to trial with FK Haugesund. He impressed the Norwegian club, but only enough for them to offer him a youth contract, so he instead signed with Swedish club Dalkurd FF. He would however only stay there for a couple of months due to work permit problems. Johnson remained in Sweden though and played for fourth tier club Assyriska IF KF during the second half of the 2011 season.

For the first half of the following season Johnson stepped down one division and played for fifth tier club Juventus IF before once again returning to the fourth tier when playing for Härnösands FF during the fall. After the season, he was awarded the title of "best midfielder" in the league Härnösand played in.

Before the 2013 season Johnson trialed with second tier Superettan club Jönköpings Södra IF but was turned down. Instead he signed a three-year deal with third tier club IK Frej. In his second season with them Johnson, who was now playing as forward, became their top goalscorer as the club was promoted to Superettan. In December 2014 Allsvenskan club Djurgårdens IF announced that they had signed Johnson on a four-year deal.

Sam Johnson made his Allsvenskan debut for Djurgården in the 1–2 loss against Elfsborg on 5 April 2015. He got his first Allsvenskan goal in the 1–2 loss against Hammarby on 13 April. After a successful first top flight season where Johnson scored a total of 10 times Djurgården turned down a 22 million SEK bid from french Ligue 1 club Bordeaux the following winter. In the summer of 2016 Johnson was sold for a 30 million SEK.

Then he joined Chinese side Wuhan Zall. He played a crucial part in the club's relegation battle, scoring six goals in 11 appearances and helping the club to finish sixth in China League One. On 14 July 2017 he was removed from the club's first squad.

On 4 February 2019 Real Salt Lake announced that they had signed Johnson to a Designated Player contract. On 31 October 2020, it was announced that Salt Lake and Johnson had mutually agreed to terminate his contract with the club.

Johnson signed with Mjällby AIF in Sweden in August 2021. On 23 April 2022, Mjällby announced his transfer to FC Aksu in Kazakhstan.

International career
Johnson played with the Liberia under-23 team in 2011 for which he scored six goals in eight games. In 2015, he started playing for the Liberia national football team.

Career statistics

International

International goals
Scores and results list Liberia's goal tally first.

References

External links
 Elite Prospects profile
 
 
 Djurgården profile

1993 births
Living people
Association football forwards
Liberian footballers
Liberia international footballers
Dalkurd FF players
Juventus IF players
Härnösands FF players
IK Frej players
Djurgårdens IF Fotboll players
Wuhan F.C. players
Vålerenga Fotball players
Real Salt Lake players
Sabah F.C. (Malaysia) players
Mjällby AIF players
Allsvenskan players
Ettan Fotboll players
Division 2 (Swedish football) players
Division 3 (Swedish football) players
China League One players
Eliteserien players
Major League Soccer players
Designated Players (MLS)
Malaysia Super League players
Liberian expatriate footballers
Expatriate footballers in Sweden
Liberian expatriate sportspeople in Sweden
Expatriate footballers in China
Liberian expatriate sportspeople in China
Expatriate footballers in Norway
Liberian expatriate sportspeople in Norway
Expatriate soccer players in the United States
Liberian expatriate sportspeople in the United States
Expatriate footballers in Malaysia
Liberian expatriate sportspeople in Malaysia
Expatriate footballers in Kazakhstan
Liberian expatriate sportspeople in Kazakhstan